Qishlah or Al-Qishlah (Arabic:قصر القشلة) is a Palace in the center of Ha'il city, Saudi Arabia. It was Built in the 1940s as a artillery and weapons deport during the principality of prince Abdulaziz bin Musaad Al Saud of Ha'il province. It is a two-floor mud palace, 142.8x141.2 meters, its walls are 8.5m high, and it has eight watch-towers along with the walls with two main gates, east and west.

Qishlah comes from the Turkish word for fort or barracks (Kışla). The purpose of building it was to make it the central location for the army troops arriving there. Then it was a prison until the end of the principality of bin Musa'ad, when it was re-purposed as a historical building by the government.

Qishlah Fort was transformed into a heritage landmark in 1995.

Notes

Castles in Saudi Arabia
Forts in Saudi Arabia
Houses completed in 1943
Palaces in Saudi Arabia